Laika (also Ile Laika, Laïka, Île Laïka) is a small uninhabited island in the Pacific Ocean, a part of the Shepherd Islands archipelago in the Shefa Province of Vanuatu.

Geography
Laika and the other islands scattered around Tongoa were once part of a larger land mass, formed by the eruptions of the Kuwae submarine volcano, which exploded around 1475.

References

Islands of Vanuatu
Shefa Province
Uninhabited islands of Vanuatu